Owanyilla is a rural town and locality in the Fraser Coast Region, Queensland, Australia. In the  the locality of Owanyilla had a population of 194 people.

Geography 
The Mary River is the western boundary of the locality. Most of the land is used for farming, predominantly grazing but also some crops.

The Bruce Highway passes from south to north through the locality. The North Coast railway line passes south to north to the west of the highway, crossing the Mary River, with the town being served by the Owanyilla railway station.

History 
In the 1840s, Owanyilla was known as Coopers Plain and Police Camp. Owanyilla was used as a barracks for the Native Police from 1857 until the mid-1860s.

Owanyilla State school opened in 1880 and closed in 1937.

In the  the locality of Owanyilla had a population of 194 people.

References

External links 
 

Towns in Queensland
Fraser Coast Region
Localities in Queensland